Micheal Azira (born 22 August 1987) is a Ugandan professional footballer who plays for New Mexico United and the Uganda national team.

Professional career
Azira signed with Charleston Battery of USL Pro in 2012. He scored the winning goal for Charleston against Wilmington Hammerheads in the 2012 USL Pro Championship match. Azira scored six more goals for the Battery in 2013.

Azira was transferred to Seattle Sounders FC of Major League Soccer on 6 March 2014. He made his MLS debut as a substitute against Montréal on 23 March.

Seattle did not renew Azira's contract following the 2015 season. Azira entered the MLS Waiver Draft in December 2015 and was selected by Colorado Rapids.

Azira was traded by the Rapids on 8 August 2018 to Montreal Impact for a fourth-round draft pick in the 2020 MLS SuperDraft.

Azira was traded again in August 2019, this time to the Chicago Fire. His contract with the club expired at the end of the 2020 season.

On 1 February 2021, Azira signed with USL Championship side New Mexico United.

International career
Azira plays for his birth nation of Uganda. Coach Milutin Sredojević selected Azira for the final 23-man roster for 2017 Africa Cup of Nations.

Coaching career
Azira served as head coach for the Daniel Island Soccer Academy U-16 and U-18 Boyz teams in Charleston, South Carolina.  He also served as assistant coach at UMS-Wright in Mobile, Alabama for two seasons, helping lead them to a state title in 2011.

Personal life
Azira previously held a U.S. green card, which qualified him as a domestic player for MLS roster purposes.

On 9 October 2021, Azira was naturalized as an American citizen in Albuquerque.

Career statistics

Club

International

Honours
Charleston Battery

 USL Pro Championship: 2012
Seattle Sounders
 U.S Open Cup: 2014
 Supporters Shield: 2014

References

External links
 
 USL Pro profile

1987 births
Living people
Sportspeople from Kampala
Association football midfielders
Ugandan footballers
Ugandan expatriate footballers
Lindsey Wilson Blue Raiders men's soccer players
Mississippi Brilla players
Charleston Battery players
Seattle Sounders FC players
Tacoma Defiance players
Colorado Rapids players
Colorado Springs Switchbacks FC players
CF Montréal players
Chicago Fire FC players
New Mexico United players
Expatriate soccer players in the United States
USL League Two players
USL Championship players
Major League Soccer players
Uganda international footballers
2017 Africa Cup of Nations players
2019 Africa Cup of Nations players
Ugandan expatriate sportspeople in the United States